Dale M. Pollock (born 1950) is an American film producer, writer and film professor. A journalist whose works have been published in a number of magazines and newspapers, Pollock is also the author of a biography of George Lucas. Pollock has produced thirteen feature films, one of which (Blaze) received an Academy Award nomination for Cinematography. He was Professor of Cinema Studies at the University of North Carolina School of the Arts from January 2007 to December 2019. He served as Interim Dean from January 1 to July 31, 2021, and is currently Emeritus Professor in the School of Filmmaking.

Personal life 
A native of Cleveland, Ohio, Pollock obtained a B.A. in Anthropology from Brandeis University and an M.S. in Communications from San Jose State University.  Pollock is married to fiddle player Susie O'Keeffe Pollock. His children are Owen Pollock, Leo Pollock and Zoe Di Novi.

Writing
An excerpt of Pollock's Master of Science thesis, "The Use of Media in a Political Campaign," was published in 1975 in Daily Variety's 42nd Anniversary Issue. Pollock's entry into journalism was as entertainment editor at the Santa Cruz Sentinel in Santa Cruz, CA. Subsequently, he joined the staff of Daily Variety in Los Angeles becoming Film Critic and Box Office Analyst, before moving to the Los Angeles Times where he became Chief Film Reporter in the Calendar, Business, Metro and Editorial sections. In addition, he has published in Life, Esquire, People Weekly, and in the Daily Variety AFI Life Achievement Award Tribute to George Lucas.  In 1983, his biography of George Lucas, Skywalking: The Life and Films of George Lucas was published. An updated version was published by Samuel French Trade in 1990 and a further updated edition in 1999 by Da Capo Press.  In 2008 Pollock began writing a monthly audio book column for the Winston Salem Journal.  Pollock's essay on the Billy Wilder film Five Graves to Cairo was published in the book Billy Wilder, Movie-Maker: Critical Essays on the Films edited by Karen McNall. Pollock's first novel, CHOPPED:A NOVEL, a vintage crime novel about the infamous Webster-Parkman trial in 1850 Boston, was published in March, 2023.

Film career
In 1985, Pollock joined The David Geffen Company as a development executive. He joined A&M Films a year later as vice president in charge of production, and was named president in 1990, producing such films as A Midnight Clear, Blaze, and Mrs. Winterbourne.  Pollock founded and ran his own film company, Peak Productions, for 10 years, producing Set It Off in 1996, among other films.

Teaching
Pollock's career at the University of North Carolina School of the Arts in Winston-Salem, N.C. began in 1999, when he became Dean of the School of Filmmaking. He held the position until 2006, when he became a professor in Cinema Studies. He had previously taught at the Peter Stark Graduate Program at the University of Southern California, the School of Professional Writing at the University of Southern California, Salem College, and the American Film Institute where he was co-chair of the Producing Program.

During his tenure as dean at the School of Filmmaking, he launched the CinEthics Conference in 2000 and in 2003 brought the RiverRun International Film Festival from Brevard, NC to Winston-Salem. He served as its Executive Director of the latter until the end of 2006, when he became chairman of the board of directors.  Pollock received the title of Professor Emeritus in December 2019. Pollock served as Interim Dean of the School of Filmmaking for the Spring semester, from January through July 2021.

Public appearances
Pollock has appeared on several national news programs, including Dateline NBC, Nightline, and National Public Radio's Morning Edition. He has presented workshops on film producing and film ethics and has moderated several panels at major film festivals including Karlovy Vary International Film Festival, Nashville Film Festival, Boston Film Festival and Palm Springs International Film Festival. From 2009-2019 Pollock appeared weekly on WXII TV Channel 12 as their film critic, beginning again in 2022.

Filmography 
He was a producer in all films unless otherwise noted.

Film

Thanks

Notes

External links 

UNCSA Faculty profile
Da Capo book profile

1950 births
American film producers
American non-fiction writers
Living people
University of North Carolina School of the Arts faculty